VAND may refer to:
 Nanded Airport, ICAO code
 D-alanine—(R)-lactate ligase, an enzyme
 WP:VAND - Wikipedia's vandalism policy